Darius Films Inc. is a film and television production company founded in 1996. Headquarters are located in Los Angeles, California, and Toronto, Ontario. Darius Films makes about 1 to 5 million dollars in sales.

Darius Films has produced over 30 feature films which have premiered at the most prestigious film festivals and have sold around the world. They have worked with cast including Ethan Hawke, Woody Harrelson, Kurt Russell, Matt Dillon, Harvey Keitel, Noomi Rapace, Nick Nolte, Susan Sarandon, Tim Roth, Samantha Bee, Sandra Oh, and many more.

Highlights of some of their productions include Stockholm, The Art of the Steal, The Padre, Weirdsville, Defendor, and The Calling.

Filmography
Motel (1998)
Jailbait (2000)
Re-Generation (2004)
The Life and Hard Times of Guy Terrifico (2005)
Cool Money (2005)
A Lobster Tale (2006)
Run Robot Run! (2006)
Weirdsville (2007)
Hank and Mike (2008)
Surviving Crooked Lake (2008)
Jack and Jill vs. the World (2008)
Cooper's Camera (2008)
Down to the Dirt (2008)
Defendor (2009)
A Beginner's Guide to Endings (2010)
Good Satan (2012)
Fugget About It (2012–2016)
The Art of the Steal (2013)
The Calling (2014)
The Intruders (2015)
Man Vs. (2015)
The Padre (2018)
Stockholm (2018)
Benjamin (2018)

References

External links
 
 Darius Films at Facebook
 Darius Films at Metacritic
Darius Films on Instagram

Television production companies of Canada
Television production companies of the United States
Companies based in Toronto
Companies based in Los Angeles
Canadian companies established in 1996
Mass media companies established in 1996